John Schermer (born 1948) is an American bridge player from Seattle, Washington.

Bridge accomplishments

Wins

 North American Bridge Championships (5)
 Vanderbilt (1) 1992 
 Senior Knockout Teams (2) 2005, 2011 
 Keohane North American Swiss Teams (1) 1977 
 Mitchell Board-a-Match Teams (1) 1978

Runners-up

 North American Bridge Championships (2)
 Spingold (1) 1986 
Baze Senior Knockout Teams (1) 2015

Notes

External links

Living people
American contract bridge players
1948 births
Place of birth missing (living people)
Date of birth missing (living people)
People from Seattle